The Roman Catholic Diocese of São João da Boa Vista is a diocese located in the city of São João da Boa Vista in the Ecclesiastical province of Ribeirão Preto in Brazil.

History
 16 January 1960: Established as Diocese of São João da Boa Vista from the Diocese of Rio Preto

Bishops
 Bishops of São João da Boa Vista (Latin Rite)
 David Picão (1960.05.14 – 1963.05.10), appointed Coadjutor Bishop of Santos, São Paulo
 Tomás Vaquero (1963.07.02 – 1991.01.23)
 Dadeus Grings (1991.01.23 – 2000.04.12), appointed Coadjutor Archbishop of Porto Alegre, Rio Grande do Sul 
 David Dias Pimentel (2001.02.07 – 2016.11.20)
 Antônio Emídio Vilar (2016.11.20 – present)

Other priests of this diocese who became bishops
Luiz Antônio Cipolini, appointed Bishop of Marília, São Paulo in 2013
Luiz Carlos Dias, appointed Auxiliary Bishop of São Paulo in 2016

Main churches

Santuário de Adoração Nossa Senhora do Rosário – Mococa-SP
Santuário do Perpétuo Socorro – São João da Boa Vista-SP
Santuário Nossa Senhora do Desterro – Casa Branca
Santuário Nossa Senhora Aparecida – Tambaú-SP
Santuário Santa Luzia – Espírito Santo do Pinhal – SP
Basílica Santuário Nossa Senhora da Conceição – Caconde – SP
Basilica Shrine of Our Lady of the Immaculate Conception, Caconde, Caconde

References

 GCatholic.org
 Catholic Hierarchy

Roman Catholic dioceses in Brazil
Christian organizations established in 1960
São João da Boa Vista, Roman Catholic Diocese of
Roman Catholic dioceses and prelatures established in the 20th century
1960 establishments in Brazil